Arderin is a mountain on the border between Laois and Offaly in Ireland. With a height of 527 metres (1,729 ft) it is the highest point in the Slieve Bloom Mountains, and is the highest point in both County Laois and County Offaly.

An Arderin is also a descriptive word for a specific category of Irish mountains in the series of lists maintained by Irish mountain database, MountainViews; those over 500m with a prominence of at least 30m. This list, along with other complementary ones, has been published in book form by Collins Press. Mountainviews.ie classifies a mountain as being above 500m, but also maintains a number of lists of hills below this threshold.

See also
Lists of mountains in Ireland
List of Irish counties by highest point
List of mountains of the British Isles by height
List of Marilyns in the British Isles

References

Marilyns of Ireland
Mountains and hills of County Offaly
Mountains and hills of County Laois
Highest points of Irish counties